Tiarah Lue Blanco (born May 5, 1997) is a Puerto Rican-born Filipino-American professional surfer from San Clemente, California who won the first place gold medal at the International Surfing Association (ISA) Open Women's World Surfing Championship 2015 in Popoyo, Nicaragua and successfully defended the title by winning the 2016 edition in Playa Jacó, Costa Rica. Blanco is a vegan and promotes the lifestyle.

Blanco has appeared in MTV's The Challenge: Champs vs. Pros and in commercials.

Blanco announced in January 2023 that she was expecting a baby with boyfriend Brody Jenner.

References

External links 

 
 
 

1997 births
American surfers
American female surfers
American veganism activists
The Challenge (TV series) contestants
Living people
Puerto Rican sportswomen